"Scars" is a song by Swedish singer and songwriter Tove Lo, released as the lead single of the soundtrack of the 2016 film The Divergent Series: Allegiant on February 19, 2016. It was written by Lo, along with Jakob Jerlström and Ludvig Söderberg; the latter two also produced the song. Lo had previously collaborated with both on her debut studio album, Queen of the Clouds.

Charts

Release history

References

External links
 

2016 songs
2016 singles
Tove Lo songs
Songs written for films
Songs written by Tove Lo
Songs written by Ludvig Söderberg
Songs written by Jakob Jerlström